The 1907–08 Columbia men's ice hockey season was the 12th season of play for the program.

Season
Former player Rudolph Von Bernuth acted as coach. R. P. Marshall served as team manager.

Note: Columbia University adopted the Lion as its mascot in 1910.

Roster

Standings

Schedule and Results

|-
!colspan=12 style=";" | Regular Season

References

Columbia Lions men's ice hockey seasons
Columbia
Columbia
Columbia
Columbia